Robert Poss is an American guitarist and music producer. He was the front man and primary composer for Band of Susans between 1986 and 1996. He has also collaborated with Rhys Chatham and the band When People Were Shorter and Lived Near the Water. He co-founded Trace Elements Records in 1980, which released records from artists such as Nicolas Collins and Phill Niblock. Robert POSs

Discography
 Sometimes (1986)
 Inverse Guitar (1988)
 ManchesterLondon (2000)
 Distortion Is Truth (2002)	
 Crossing Casco Bay (2002)

References

External links

American rock singers
American rock guitarists
American male guitarists
American alternative rock musicians
Noise rock musicians
Shoegaze musicians
Living people
Band of Susans members
Singer-songwriters from New York (state)
Guitarists from New York City
Year of birth missing (living people)
American male singer-songwriters